Michael A. McManus Jr. (born March 11, 1943) is an American political strategist who served as White House Communications Director from 1984 to 1985 and now Director of Novavax .

References

1943 births
Living people
University of Notre Dame alumni
Georgetown University Law Center alumni
White House Communications Directors
Reagan administration personnel